Philippe Lefebure (18 June 1908 – 5 June 1973) was a French ice hockey player. He competed in the men's tournament at the 1928 Winter Olympics.

References

1908 births
1973 deaths
Ice hockey players at the 1928 Winter Olympics
Olympic ice hockey players of France
Ice hockey people from Paris